Parliamentary elections were held in the Maldives on 24 November 1989. As there were no political parties at the time, all candidates ran as independents. Voter turnout was 68.7%.

Results

References

Maldives
Parliamentary election
Elections in the Maldives
Non-partisan elections
Maldives